Gravendal a minor locality in Ludvika Municipality, Dalarna County, Sweden with a population of about 40.

History 
Gravendal was founded by Sebastian Grave (1684-1748) in 1720 to meet the rising demand for Lumber.  Reaching a peak activity between the years 1881 thru 1909.	
Located at the site was a saw, mill, trip hammer, sheetmetal smithy and nail smithy. Gravendal became among other things, known for the horseshoes forged there.

Trivia 
Gravendal has given its name to one of Sweden's best-selling cider produced by Spendrups brewery.

References 

Populated places in Dalarna County